Kaitlyn Christian (born January 13, 1992) is a tennis player from the United States.
Christian is primarily a doubles player. She has a career-high doubles ranking of world No. 38, achieved in February 2019, and a career-high singles ranking of 570, reached in September 2017.

Personal life
Christian was Emma Stone's body double as Billie Jean King in the 2017 film Battle of the Sexes, and she also is credited as portraying tennis player Kerry Melville in the film. She also portrayed tennis player Shaun Stafford in the 2021 film King Richard.

Grand Slam doubles performance timeline

WTA career finals

Doubles: 6 (1 title, 5 runner-ups)

WTA 125 tournament finals

Doubles: 1 (1 title)

ITF Circuit finals

Singles: 3 (1–2)

Doubles: 19 (13–6)

References

External links
 
 
 
 
 USC Trojans profile
 

1992 births
Living people
American female tennis players
Sportspeople from Orange, California
USC Trojans women's tennis players
Tennis people from California
Universiade medalists in tennis
Universiade bronze medalists for the United States
Medalists at the 2013 Summer Universiade